Black and Blue is a BBC TV comedy-drama series, first broadcast in the 1973. Its overall title refers to the black and blue humour of the episodes.

The show consisted of 6 television plays of 50–60 minutes duration, each being separate and self-contained from the others, the only connection between them being the two types of humour.

The first episode was broadcast on 14 August 1973, with the last episode airing on 18 September 1973. The episode "Secrets" was wiped, only surviving because a domestic videotape copy was made from the mastertape by its producer, Mark Shivas.

Episode guide

 "Secrets"
 "The Middle-of-the-Road Roadshow for All the Family"
 "High Kampf"
 "Rust"
 "Soap Opera in Stockwell"
 "Glorious Miles"

External links

1973 British television series debuts
1973 British television series endings
1970s British comedy television series
BBC television comedy
1970s British anthology television series
British comedy-drama television shows
English-language television shows